Valdez City Schools is a school district in Valdez, Alaska.

It has three schools: Hermon Hutchens Elementary, George H. Gilson Middle School, and Valdez High School, and an organized home-school program.

History

On May 25, 1901, Mrs. Alice Leedy opened a school in the Episocopal Church.

The school district itself was founded on September 6, 1901.  Adam Wan was elected president.  School opened on September 9 and met in City Hall. Mrs. Alice Leedy was the teacher.  Only students ages 6 and older were eligible to attend.

The first actual school building opened on November 11, 1901.

By 1903, there were 3 classrooms and 60 students, one each for primary, intermediate, and upper grades.

By 1912, the high school served 4 grades and by 1913 the school had its first graduate.

After the entire town moved as a result of the 1964 Alaska earthquake, new schools were built, including Growden-Harrison Elementary School, which was the first building completed as part of the post-earthquake relocation effort.  This school was named after two victims of the earthquake.  Growden-Harrison ceased being an elementary school in 1986.

References

School districts in Alaska
Education in Unorganized Borough, Alaska
1901 establishments in Alaska
School districts established in 1901